The Royal League 2004–05 was the first season of the Scandinavian Royal League football tournament. Play started on 11 November 2004, and ended in a final between FC Copenhagen and IFK Göteborg on 26 May 2005, with Copenhagen winning the title in a penalty shootout.

Bonuses
All prize money amounts are in Norwegian kroner.
1st group stage
Qualification (for the tournament itself) - 1,250,000 NOK
Win - 250,000 NOK
Draw - 150,000 NOK
2nd group stage
Qualification (for the 2nd group stage) - 1,500,000 NOK
Win - 500,000 NOK
Draw - 250,000 NOK
Final
Win (final champion) - 3,000,000 NOK
Draw (final runner-up) - 1,000,000 NOK
This would give a team with a perfect record throughout the tournament a total of 7,750,000 NOK.

First group stage

Group A

Group B

Group C

Second group stage

Group 1

Group 2

Final

Top scorers

See also
 2004–05 Royal League statistics

 
2004–05
  
2004–05 in Danish football
2004 in Swedish football
2005 in Swedish football
2004 in Norwegian football
2005 in Norwegian football